Brad Zoern (born June 19, 1970) is a Los Angeles based Canadian re-recording mixer, best known for his work in 2017 film The Shape of Water for which he was co-nominated with Christian Cooke and Glen Gauthier for Sound Mixing at 90th Academy Awards.

References

External links 
 

1970 births
Artists from Windsor, Ontario
Canadian sound artists
Living people